Gerald Clery Murphy and Sara Sherman Wiborg were wealthy, expatriate Americans who moved to the French Riviera in the early 20th century and who, with their generous hospitality and flair for parties, created a vibrant social circle, particularly in the 1920s, that included a great number of artists and writers of the Lost Generation. Gerald had a brief but significant career as a painter.

Gerald Murphy
Gerald Clery Murphy (March 26, 1888 – October 17, 1964) was born in Boston to the family that owned the Mark Cross Company, sellers of fine leather goods. He was of an Irish-American background. His father was Patrick Francis Murphy (1858–1931); he had two siblings: Esther Knesborough (1897–1962) and Patrick Timothy Murphy (1884–1924).

Gerald was an aesthete from his childhood. He was never comfortable in the boardrooms and clubs for which his father was grooming him. He failed the entrance exams at Yale University three times before matriculating, but he performed respectably there. He joined Delta Kappa Epsilon and the Skull and Bones society. He befriended a young freshman named Cole Porter (Yale class of 1913) and brought him into Delta Kappa Epsilon. Murphy also introduced Porter to his friends, propelling him into writing music for Yale musicals.

Sara Sherman Wiborg

Sara Sherman Wiborg (November 7, 1883 – October 10, 1975) was born in Cincinnati, Ohio into the wealthy Wiborg family. Her father, manufacturing chemist and owner of his own printing ink and varnish company Frank Bestow Wiborg, was a self-made millionaire by the age of 40, and her mother, Adeline Sherman Wiborg, was a member of the noted Sherman family, daughter of Hoyt Sherman and niece to Civil War General William Tecumseh Sherman and Senator John Sherman. Raised in Cincinnati, she moved with her family to Germany for several years when she was a teenager, so her father could concentrate on the European expansion of his company. The Wiborg family was easily accepted into the high society community of 20th-century Europe. While in Europe, Sara and her sisters Hoytie and Olga sang at high-class assemblies. Upon returning to the United States, the Wiborgs spent most of their time in New York City and later East Hampton, where they built the 30-room mansion The Dunes on 600 acres just west of the Maidstone Club in 1912. It was the largest estate in East Hampton up to that time. Wiborg Beach in East Hampton is named for the family.

Marriage
In East Hampton, Sara Wiborg and Gerald Murphy met when they were both adolescents. Gerald was five years younger than Sara, and for many years, they were more familiar companions than romantically attached; they became engaged in 1915 when Sara was 32 years old. Sara's parents did not approve of their daughter marrying someone "in trade," and Gerald's parents were not much happier with the prospect, seemingly because his father found it difficult to approve anything that Gerald did.

After marrying they lived at 50 West 11th Street in New York City, where they had three children. In 1921, they moved to Paris to escape the strictures of New York and their families' mutual dissatisfaction with their marriage. In Paris Gerald took up painting, and they began to make the acquaintances for which they became famous. Eventually they moved to the French Riviera, where they became the center of a large circle of artists and writers of later fame, especially Zelda and F. Scott Fitzgerald, Ernest Hemingway, John Dos Passos, Fernand Léger, Jean Cocteau, Pablo Picasso, Archibald MacLeish, John O'Hara, Cole Porter, Dorothy Parker and Robert Benchley.

Prior to their arrival on the French Riviera, the region was experiencing a period when the fashionable only wintered there, abandoning the region during the high summer months. However, the activities of the Murphys fueled the same renaissance in arts and letters as did the excitement of Paris, especially among the cafés of Montparnasse. In 1923 the Murphys convinced the Hotel du Cap to stay open for the summer so that they might entertain their friends, sparking a new era for the French Riviera as a summer haven. The Murphys eventually purchased a villa in Cap d'Antibes and named it Villa America, where they resided for many years. When the Murphys arrived on the Riviera, lying on the beach merely to enjoy the sun was not a common activity. Occasionally, someone went swimming, but the joys of being at the beach just for sun were still unknown at the time. The Murphys, with their long forays and picnics at La Garoupe, introduced sunbathing on the beach as a fashionable activity.

They had three children, Baoth, Patrick, and Honoria. In 1929, Patrick was diagnosed with tuberculosis. They took him to Switzerland, and then returned to the U.S. in 1934, where Gerald stayed in Manhattan to run Mark Cross, serving as president of the company from 1934 to 1956; he never painted again. Sara settled in Saranac Lake, New York to nurse Patrick, and Baoth and Honoria were put in boarding schools. In 1935, Baoth died unexpectedly of meningitis as a complication of measles, and Patrick succumbed to tuberculosis in 1937. Archibald MacLeish based the main characters in his play J.B. on Gerald and Sara Murphy.

Later they lived at The Dunes. By 1941, the house proved impossible to rent, sell or even maintain; the Murphys had it demolished, and they moved to the renovated dairy barn.

Death and legacy

Gerald died October 17, 1964, in East Hampton, two days after his friend Cole Porter. Sara died on October 10, 1975, in Arlington, Virginia.

Nicole and Dick Diver of Tender Is the Night by F. Scott Fitzgerald are widely recognized as having been based on the Murphys, mainly from the marked physical similarities, although many of their friends, as well as the Murphys themselves, saw as much or more of Zelda and Scott Fitzgerald's relationship and personalities in the couple than those of the Murphys. Ernest Hemingway's couple in The Garden of Eden is not explicitly based on this pair, but given the similarities of the setting (Nice) and of the type of social group portrayed, there is clearly some basis for such an assumption. Guests of the Murphys often swam at Eden Roc, an event emulated in Hemingway's narrative.

Calvin Tomkins's biography of Gerald and Sara Murphy Living Well Is the Best Revenge was published in The New Yorker in 1962, and Amanda Vaill documented their lives in the 1995 book Everybody Was So Young. Both accounts are balanced, unlike some of the portrayals in the memoirs and fictitious works by their friends, including Fitzgerald and Hemingway.

In 1982, Honoria Murphy Donnelly, the Murphys' daughter, with Richard N. Billings, wrote Sara & Gerald: Villa America and After.

On July 12, 2007, a play by Crispin Whittell titled Villa America, based entirely on the relationships between Sara and Gerald Murphy and their friends, had its world premiere at the Williamstown Theatre Festival with Jennifer Mudge playing Sara Murphy.

Paintings by Gerald Murphy
Gerald only painted from 1921 until 1929; he is known for his hard-edged still life paintings in a Precisionist, Cubist style. During the 1920s Gerald Murphy, along with other American modernist painters in Europe, notably Charles Demuth and Stuart Davis, created paintings prefiguring the pop art movement that contained pop culture imagery, such as mundane objects culled from American commercial products and advertising design.
Wasp and Pear, 1929
Cocktail, 1927
Watch, 1925
Razor, 1924

Gerald Murphy’s jazz-rhythmed painting titled "Razor" (1924) and the 6-by-6-foot "Watch" (1925) are part of the Dallas Museum’s permanent collection and are two of eight remaining paintings in Murphy’s 14-work oeuvre.

Paintings of Sara Murphy by Picasso
Pablo Picasso, a friend of Sara, painted her in several of his 1923 works: 
 Femme assise les bras croisés
 Portrait de Sarah Murphy
 Buste de Femme (Sara Murphy)
 Femme assise en bleu et rose
 Woman Seated in an Armchair

Archives
The Sara and Gerald Murphy Papers are held at the Beinecke Rare Book and Manuscript Library at Yale University. Some Mark Cross Company objects are located at the Metropolitan Museum of Art.

References

External links
Sara and Gerald Murphy Papers at the Beinecke Rare Book and Manuscript Library, Yale University.
Artcyclopedia link
Book review of Everybody Was So Young
Britannica excerpt
AskArt link
New Yorker article
New Yorker slide show of paintings and photographs

 Sara Murphy and writers of the Lost Generation discussed in Conversations from Penn State interview

Further reading
 Calvin Tomkins, Living Well Is the Best Revenge: The Life of Gerald and Sara Murphy (New York: Viking Press, 1971; Modern Library edition published in 1998). An enlarged version of a 1962 New Yorker profile of the couple.
 Amanda Vaill, Everybody was so young. Gerald and Sara Murphy—a lost generation love story. Houghton Mifflin, Boston and New York 1998. 
 Lisa Cohen, All We Know:  Three Lives (Farrar, Straus and Giroux; First Edition (July 17, 2012))  Esther Murphy Strachey biography, details early Murphy life and the Mark Cross family business.

Married couples
American expatriates in France